Barred O may refer to:

Ɵ (Ɵ ɵ), a letter of the African reference alphabet. The minuscule is also use for the close-mid central rounded vowel.
Oe (Cyrillic) (Ө ө), a letter of the Cyrillic alphabet.

See also
Ѳ ѳ :  Cyrillic letter Fita
Θ θ/ : Greek letter Theta
Ø : Scandinavian letter Ø